Aaron Twersky of Chernobyl (1784–1871) was a Ukrainian rabbi. He succeeded his father Rabbi Mordechai Twersky as rebbe of the Chernobler chasidim.

Biography
Aaron Twersky was born in Chernobyl in 1784, the first-born of Rabbi Mordechai Twersky and Chayo Soro (daughter of Rabbi Aaron the Great of Karlin).

He received his education from his grandfather, Rabbi Menachem Nachum Twersky of Chernobyl.

He married the daughter of Rabbi Gedalyo of Linits (author of Teshuos Chein), who bore him two daughters, Chayo Soro (who married Yisroel, grandson of Rabbi Nachman of Breslov) and Perl (who married Rabbi Yitschok of Berezne).

Twersky later married the daughter of Rabbi Tsvi of Korostyshiv. She bore him three sons – Menachem Nochum of Loiev, Yeshayo Meshulom Zishe of Chernobyl and Boruch Osher of Chernobyl – and a daughter, Feygl, who married Rabbi Duvid Moshe Friedman of Czortków.

He wrote an approbation to Or laYshorim by Rabbi Yechiel Michel Epstein.

References 
 Aharon Dovid Twersky היחס מטשרנוביל The Chernobyl Genealogy, 2nd ed. Lublin 1938
  Yitshak Alfasi, תורת החסידות  Torat haChasidut, #271, Mosad Harv Kook, Jerusalem 2006

1784 births
1871 deaths
Rebbes of Chernobyl
People from Chornobyl
People from Kiev Voivodeship
Descendants of the Baal Shem Tov